City of the Sun is a 2015 South Korean television series based on the Japanese novel  by Jun Ikeido. Starring Kim Joon, Jung Min, Song Min-jung, Jung Joo-yeon and Kim Sung-kyung, it aired on MBC Dramanet from January 30 to April 7, 2015 for 16 episodes.

Cast

Main characters 
 Kim Joon as Kang Tae-yang
 Jung Min as So Woo-jin
 Song Min-jung as Han Ji-soo
 Jung Joo-yeon as So Hye-jin
 Kim Sung-kyung as Yoon Sun-hee

Supporting characters 
 Im Dae-ho as Park Yoon-sik
 Jung Han-yong as Bae Myung-je
 Yoon Seung-won as Company president So
 Son Min-suk as Kkangdagu Park
 Seo Ji-yeon as So Eun-jin
 Lee Hee-suk as Choi Dae-won
 Ha Yoon-hee as Choi Yoon-hee/Choi Ki-ja
 Dabi as Jo Min-joo
 Kim Kyung-ryong
 Kim Joon-goo
 Kim Deok-hyun
 Shim Yang-hong
 Ahn Sang-tae
 Yoon Taek
 Heo Sung-tae as detective.

References

External links 
 City of the Sun official MBC Dramanet website 
 

2015 South Korean television series debuts
2015 South Korean television series endings
MBC TV television dramas
Korean-language television shows
Television shows based on Japanese novels